Josephine Antoinette Ward was born in 1820 at Sing Sing, Westchester County, New York.  She was the eldest child of Aaron Ward and Mary Watson Ward.

Career
She was a founding member of the Princeton  Daughters of the American Revolution.

She was the first benefactor of the Princeton University Graduate College

With Kate McFarlane, Josephine helped preserve Rockingham, George Washington's final headquarters of the Revolutionary War, from demolition and decay.

Personal life
She was the second wife of Senator John R. Thomson from 1845 until his death in 1862.

In 1878, Josephine became the second wife of former Governor of Maryland, Thomas Swann.  Some of the groom's family said this was a sign of "insanity growing out of dotage."  The Governor was 72 at the time.  The couple separated in 1880.

Josephine was a frequent participant in Miss Matoaca Gay's Shakespeare seminars during the 1880s and 1890s.

She died 2 March 1906 in Washington, D.C. and is buried at Princeton, New Jersey.

References

1820 births
1906 deaths
Daughters of the American Revolution people
People from Ossining, New York
Spouses of New Jersey politicians